G. I. Joe: A Real American Hero is a 1985 action shoot 'em up video game. It was developed and published by Epyx for the Apple II and Commodore 64.

Gameplay
At the beginning of the game the player selects a one player or two player game. The objective as one of the members of the G.I. Joe team is to eliminate any threats from Cobra and to capture eight Cobra operatives. The game cannot be completed if too many members of either side are placed in jail, other members are released to perpetuate the game.

Two modes of play are used: overhead vehicular combat sections, where the player controls a member of the G.I. Joe Special Forces, and one-on-one fights with Cobra operatives. In the overhead combat portion of the game, the player could select one of eight Joe team members (such as Snake Eyes), to face off in combat against one of eight Cobra agents (such as Zartan). There are different geographical locations, such as woods, desert and arctic tundra. Each character had access to a vehicle from the G.I. Joe series, such as the Dragonfly helicopter, Rattler plane, M.O.B.A.T. or H.I.S.S. tank.

The one-on-one melee battle portion of the game featured sixteen characters available for the Joe team: Duke, Scarlett, Recondo, Torpedo, Snake Eyes, Roadblock, Spirit, Zap, Gung-Ho, Snow Job, Blowtorch, Stalker, Ace, Wild Bill, Steeler, and Clutch. The Joes were pitted against eight Cobras: Destro, the Baroness, Zartan, Firefly, Cobra Commander, Storm Shadow, Major Bludd, and Scrap-Iron.

Development
Epyx was a prime supporter of the Commodore 64 as a gaming platform, with licensed games such as G.I. Joe as an example. The game was designed by Ray Carpenter and Jeff Johannigman, with graphics by Pam Carpenter and music by Bob Vieira.

References

External links
 G.I. Joe: A Real American Hero at Lemon 64

1985 video games
Apple II games
Commodore 64 games
Epyx games
G.I. Joe video games
Multiplayer and single-player video games
Shoot 'em ups
Tank simulation video games
Video games developed in the United States